The Huon-class minehunter coastal (MHC) ships are a group of minehunters built for the Royal Australian Navy (RAN). Following problems with the s, a request for tender was issued in 1993 for a class of six coastal minehunters under the project designation SEA 1555. The tender was awarded in 1994 to the partnership of Australian Defence Industries (ADI) and Intermarine SpA, which was offering a variant of the Italian .

Five of the six ships were constructed completely in Newcastle, New South Wales, while the hull of the first ship was built in Italy, then transported to Australia for fitting out. Construction ran from 1994 to 2003, with lead ship  entering service in 1999. In 2006, following a capability review three years prior, one minehunter was placed in reserve, while another was marked for transfer to reserve status; this instruction was reversed prior to 2008, and the two vessels were tasked with supporting border protection operations. As of January 2014, only four vessels were active, with the other two placed in reserve.

Development and tendering
In 1993, the Department of Defence issued a request for tender for six coastal minehunters to replace the problematic s, of which four had been cancelled after the first two demonstrated problems with their sonar array and seakeeping capability. According to the request for tender, the designs had to be modified to operate in Australian conditions, and at least 60% of each ship and her equipment had to be of Australian manufacture. On 12 August 1994, Project SEA 1555 was awarded to ADI.

Design and construction
The design of the Huon class is based on the Italian ; specifically the second run of eight ships known as the Gaeta class. The minehunters' main propulsion system is a single Fincantieri GMT BL230-BN diesel motor, which provides  to a single controllable-pitch propeller, allowing the ship to reach . The standard ship's company consists of 6 officers and 34 sailors, with accommodation for 9 additional (typically trainees or clearance divers). The main armament on a Huon-class vessel is a MSI DS30B 30 mm cannon; this is supplemented by two 0.50 calibre machine guns. The sensor suite includes a Kelvin-Hughes Type 1007 navigational radar, a GEC-Marconi Type 2093M variable-depth minehunting sonar, an AWADI PRISM radar warning and direction-finding system, and a Radamec 1400N surveillance system. Two Wallop Super Barricade decoy launchers are also fitted.

For minehunting operations, the Huons use three  Riva Calzoni azimuth thrusters to provide a maximum speed of : two are located at the stern, while the third is sited behind the variable-depth sonar. Mines are located with the minehunting sonar, and can be disposed of by the vessel's two Double Eagle mine disposal vehicles, the Oropesa mechanical sweep, the Mini-Dyad magnetic influence sweep, or the towed AMASS influence sweep (which is not always carried). To prevent damage in the event a Huon-class ship triggers a mine, the ships were built with a glass-reinforced plastic, moulded in a single monocoque skin with no ribs or framework. As the ships often work with clearance divers, they are fitted with a small recompression chamber.

Six Huon-class ships were built; all were named after famous Australian rivers (the names of which had been carried by previous RAN vessels). The hull of the lead ship, was laid down during September 1994 at the Intermarine SpA Sarzana shipyard in Italy, and was transferred out to ADI's Newcastle facility as deck cargo, arriving on 31 August 1995. Huon was completed in Newcastle in 1999, and the other five ships were constructed completely at the Australian shipyard, with 69% Australian content in the project. All six were completed on schedule, with the last, commissioning on 1 March 2003.

Operational history
As part of the force structure changes arising from the 2003 Defence Capability Review two Huon-class ships were deactivated and placed in reserve. HMAS Huon was deactivated in early 2006, but was reactivated later in the year, while HMAS Hawkesburys planned deactivation was cancelled so the ships could be used as patrol boats.

Apart from routine service in Australian and regional waters, a number of vessels were deployed to the Solomon Islands as part of the Australian-led RAMSI peacekeeping mission there. Operating as part of Operation Anode from 2003, vessels deployed have included Hawkesbury, Diamantina, Yarra and Gascoyne. As of 2008, Huon and Hawkesbury were taking turns supporting border security operations. However, by October 2011 Hawkesbury and Norman were placed into reserve; the Department of Defence predicted that it would take five years to bring both back to operational status and train enough personnel to run all six vessels.

Eventual replacement

Defending Australia in the Asia Pacific Century: Force 2030, the 2009 Department of Defence white paper, proposed replacing the Huons, along with the RAN's patrol and hydrographic vessels, with a single class of multi-role offshore combatant vessels (OCVs). The new vessels, which could displace up to 2,000 tonnes and be equipped for helicopter or unmanned aerial vehicle operations, will use a modular mission payload system to change between roles as required. Although the 2013 White Paper committed to the OCV as a long-term plan, it announced that life-extending upgrades to the Huons would be sought as a short-term solution. In 2020 the Royal Australian Navy announced that the Huon class may be replaced with a modified version of the Arafura-class offshore patrol vessel.

Ships

Citations

References

External links

Mine warfare vessel classes